Senator Sims or Simms may refer to:

Betty Sims (1935–2016), Missouri State Senate
Freddie Powell Sims (born 1950), Georgia State Senate
Frederick W. Sims (1862–1925), Virginia State Senate
Kathleen Sims (1942–2019), Idaho State Senate
Leonard Henly Sims (1807–1886), Arkansas State Senate
W. Timothy Simms (born 1943), Illinois State Senate

See also
Daniel Symmes (1772–1817), Ohio State Senate
Steve Symms (born 1938), U.S. Senator from Idaho from 1981 to 1993